Jī is the Mandarin pinyin romanization of the Chinese surname written  in Chinese characters. It is romanized as Chi in Wade–Giles and Kai or Gai in Cantonese. Ji is listed 194th in the Song dynasty classic Hundred Family Surnames. Relatively uncommon, it is not among the top 300 surnames in China.

Origin
According to the Yuanhe Xing Zuan, a Tang-era text on Chinese genealogy, the Ji surname originated from Kuaiji (present-day Shaoxing) on the southern shore of Hangzhou Bay in Zhejiang. King Shao Kang of the Xia was said to have enfeoffed one of his sons in the place and his descendants adopted Kuaiji or Ji (written ) as their surname. Then, during the early Han dynasty, a branch of this clan was said to have migrated to Mount Ji in Qiao Commandery (within modern Bozhou in Anhui). They then altered the character of their surname to match their new home.

Later adoption
During the Xianbei Northern Wei dynasty, Emperor Xiaowen  implemented a drastic policy of sinicization, ordering his own people to adopt Chinese surnames. The Tongji tribe of the Xianbei adopted Ji as their surname.

Notable people
Ji Kang (嵇康; 223–262), Cao Wei era scholar and philosopher, one of the Seven Sages of the Bamboo Grove
Ji Shao (嵇紹; 253–304), son of Ji Kang, died when protecting Emperor Hui of Jin during the War of the Eight Princes
Ji Huang (嵇璜; 1711–1794), Qing dynasty politician and hydrologist
Ji Wenfu (嵇文甫; 1895–1963), philosopher, President of Henan University, Vice Governor of Henan province
Ji Ruyun (嵇汝运; 1918–2010), chemist, academician of Chinese Academy of Sciences

References

Chinese-language surnames
Individual Chinese surnames